The 2018–19 Deutsche Eishockey Liga season was the 25th season since the founding of the Deutsche Eishockey Liga running from 14 September 2018 to 30 April 2019.

All 14 clubs from the previous year and the Löwen Frankfurt applied for a license. The season saw the same teams as last year, as all teams were given their license.

After a points-per-game record during the regular season with 2,23 points per game, the Adler Mannheim won the title for their seventh time defeating EHC Red Bull München 4–1 in the finals.

Player and staff awards
During the season, Danny aus den Birken, goalkeeper of EHC Red Bull München was selected als player of the year and goalie of the year. Philipp Gogulla from Düsseldorfer EG was awarded as forward of the year whereas Joonas Lehtivouri from the Adler Mannheim was elected as defenceman of the year. For the award of the best rookie of the year, the later NHL first round pick Moritz Seider was chosen by the DEL-fans. The lineup is completed by Don Jackson (RB München) as coach of the year.
After the playoffs, Adler Mannheim's goalkeeper Dennis Endras was awarded with the MVP of the playoffs-title.

Teams

Regular season

Standings

Results

Matches 1–26

Matches 27–52

Playoffs
The playoffs started on 6 March 2019.

Bracket

Pre-playoffs
The playoff qualification were played between 6 and 10 March 2019 in a best-of-three mode.

Fischtown Pinguins vs. Thomas Sabo Ice Tigers

Straubing Tigers vs. Eisbären Berlin

Quarterfinals
The quarterfinals were played between 12 and 31 March 2019 in a best-of-seven mode.

Adler Mannheim vs. Thomas Sabo Ice Tigers

EHC Red Bull München vs. Eisbären Berlin

Augsburger Panther vs. Düsseldorfer EG

Kölner Haie vs. ERC Ingolstadt

Semifinals
The semifinals were played between 2 and 16 April 2019 in a best-of-seven mode.

Adler Mannheim vs. Kölner Haie

EHC Red Bull München vs. Augsburger Panther

Final
The final was played between 18 and 30 April 2019 in a best-of-seven mode.

Statistics

Scoring leaders
List shows the top skaters sorted by points, then goals.

Leading goaltenders
Only the top five goaltenders, based on save percentage, who have played at least 40% of their team's minutes, are included in this list.

References

External links
Official website

2018-19
DEL
2018–19 in German ice hockey